A tin soldier is a miniature figure of a toy soldier.

Tin soldier may also refer to:

Songs
 "Tin Soldier", a 1967 song written by Steve Marriott and first recorded by Small Faces
 "Little Tin Soldier", a single from the 1969 album What About Today? by Barbra Streisand
 "One Tin Soldier", a 1969 song written by Dennis Lambert and Brian Potter and first recorded by The Original Caste

Other uses
 Tin Soldier, a 1974 novella by Joan D. Vinge
 The Tin Soldier, an English company that produces miniature figures
 "The Steadfast Tin Soldier", an 1838 fairy tale by Hans Christian Andersen
 The Steadfast Tin Soldier, a 1975 ballet based on the fairy tale
 The Steadfast Tin Soldier, a 1976 animated film based on the fairy tale

See also
 Lead-tin solder, a type of fusible metal alloy
 Steel Soldiers, a real-time strategy game released in 2001 the Windows platform